Marco Facoli (c. 1540–1585), Venice, was an Italian organist, harpsichordist and composer.

Works 
 Il Primo Libro d’Intavolatura (1586), lost.
 Il Secondo Libro d’Intavolatura di Balli d’Arpichordo, Pass’e mezzi, Saltarelli, Padouane, Venice, 1588 (posthumous).

References 
 Berthe Dedoyard. Des musiques pour arpicordo de Marco Facoli: à la découverte d'un testament inconnu. Revue belge de Musicologie / Belgisch Tijdschrift voor Muziekwetenschap, vol. 41, (1987), pp. 63–74. JSTOR
 H. Colin Slim. Facoli, Marco. Grove Music Online. Oxford Music Online. Oxford University Press, (accessed April 2, 2014), Oxford Music Online

16th-century births
1585 deaths
16th-century Italian composers
Musicians from Venice